Beckh is a surname. Notable people with the surname include:

Friedrich Beckh (1908–1942), German World War II participant
Count Alois von Beckh Widmanstätten (1753–1849), Austrian scientist
Hermann Beckh (1875–1937), German Tibetologist

See also
Beck (surname)